Portugal has participated in the Eurovision Young Dancers 4 times since its debut in 1989.

Participation overview

See also
Portugal in the Eurovision Song Contest
Portugal in the Junior Eurovision Song Contest 
Portugal in the Eurovision Young Musicians

External links 
 Eurovision Young Dancers

Countries in the Eurovision Young Dancers